Verbiv - village in Ternopil Raion of Ternopil Oblast, Ukraine. It belongs to Pidhaitsi urban hromada, one of the hromadas of Ukraine. 

Until 18 July 2020, Verbiv belonged to Pidhaitsi Raion. The raion was abolished in July 2020 as part of the administrative reform of Ukraine, which reduced the number of raions of Ternopil Oblast to three. The area of Pidhaitsi Raion was merged into Ternopil Raion.

Population

 Population in 2001: 968 inhabitants.

References

Sources

External links
 

Villages in Ternopil Raion